Churn is the debut studio album by American post-grunge band Seven Mary Three. It was independently released and preceded the band's mainstream breakthrough, American Standard. Churn also included two songs that would be re-recorded and go on to be among Seven Mary Three's biggest singles. The album was re-released several years later with different album artwork. It was again re-released on December 9, 2008 via digital music sellers and the band's website.

Track listing
All songs written and arranged by Seven Mary Three.
"Cumbersome" – 6:03
"Water's Edge" – 5:13
"Devil Boy" – 5:16
"Roderigo" – 5:19
"Lame" – 5:03
"Kater" – 5:59
"Margarette" – 5:01
"Anything" – 5:11
"Punch In Punch Out" – 2:12
"Favorite Dog" – 5:27

Album credits
Jason Ross – lead vocals, rhythm guitar
Jason Pollock – lead guitar, backing vocals
Casey Daniel – bass
Giti Khalsa – drums
Virginia Martin – violin on "Anything"

Production
Producers: Seven Mary Three and Kevin McNoldy
Executive Producers: Seven Mary Three and Mike Moran
Engineering: Kevin McNoldy
Mixing: Kevin McNoldy
Art Direction: Aaron Norfolk, Jason Ross, and Jason Pollock
Photography: Aaron Norfolk

References

1994 debut albums
Seven Mary Three albums